Héraðsflói is a bay in eastern Iceland, formed by the outflowing of the Jökulsá á Brú and Lagarfljót rivers. The ~25 km-long beach is the Héraðssandur.

References

External links
Heradsfloi East Iceland

Bays of Iceland